The Black Tulip is a 1937 British, black-and-white historical drama film directed by Alex Bryce and starring Patrick Waddington, Ann Soreen, Campbell Gullan and Bernard Lee. The film is based on the novel The Black Tulip by Alexandre Dumas. It was produced by Fox-British Pictures at Wembley Studios as a quota quickie.

Premise
In the Dutch Republic in 1672, a wealthy man Cornelius Van Baerle devotes his life to growing tulips unaware of his family's close involvement with political intrigue.

Cast
 Patrick Waddington – Cornelus Van Baerle 
 Ann Soreen – Rosa 
 Campbell Gullan – Isaac Boxtel 
 Jay Laurier – Gryphus 
 Wilson Coleman – Cornelius de Witt 
 Bernard Lee – William III of Orange
 Florence Hunt – Julia Boxtel 
 Ronald Shiner – Hendrik 
 Aubrey Mallalieu – Colonel Marnix

References

External links
 
 
 

1937 films
1930s historical drama films
British black-and-white films
Films based on French novels
Films set in the 1670s
Films set in the Netherlands
British historical drama films
Films shot at Wembley Studios
Films based on works by Alexandre Dumas
Cultural depictions of William III of England
1937 drama films
1930s English-language films
1930s British films